The Chrysler 700C is a concept luxury minivan unveiled at the 2012 North American International Auto Show in Detroit by Chrysler.  

It was presented to the public to gauge the public's thoughts on the design as an option to redesign or replace the Chrysler Town and Country minivan. The 2017 Chrysler Pacifica minivan, which replaced the Town & Country, took design cues from this concept car.

References

700C
2010s cars
Minivans
Front-wheel-drive vehicles